Wang Chih-sheng is a Taiwanese football player. He currently plays for Tatung F.C. He also plays futsal and represent Taiwan national futsal team in several international competitions.

References 

Living people
Taiwanese footballers
Taiwanese men's futsal players
Tatung F.C. players
Association football defenders
Year of birth missing (living people)